Yao Chen (born 25 September 1988) is a retired Chinese female volleyball player. She was part of the China women's national volleyball team.

She participated in the 2010 FIVB Volleyball Women's World Championship. She played with Army.

Clubs
  Army (2010)

References

1988 births
Living people
Chinese women's volleyball players
Place of birth missing (living people)
21st-century Chinese women